Wasiru Mohammed (born 16 February 1996) is a Ghanaian professional boxer who has held the WBO Global super-bantamweight title since 2019. As of October 2020, he is ranked as the world's sixth best super-bantamweight by the WBO.

Professional career
Mohammed made his professional debut on 29 April 2017, defeating Isaac Mensah by fourth-round technical knockout (TKO) in Accra. After firing off seven wins in less than a year, including six by stoppage, he received his first title shot on 12 May 2018, and scored a first-round knockout (KO) of veteran Kamarudeen Boyefio for the vacant Ghanaian super bantamweight title. Two months later he knocked out another experienced fighter in Raymond Commey to retain his belt.

On 13 October 2018, Mohammed faced undefeated prospect Isaac Sackey for his WBO Africa super bantamweight title. In the second round, Sackey held onto him excessively until Mohammed finally threw him off in the closing seconds, and they both threw multiple punches after the bell. Less than a minute into the next round, Mohammed floored the defending champion with a hard right. He rose to his feet quickly but referee Adorn Bertin waved off the fight without a mandatory eight count. Sackey's team rushed into the ring to confront Bertin, after which chaos erupted inside the Bukom Boxing Arena and the event promptly ended without an official decision. The fight spilled outside the ring as chairs were thrown and used as weapons, with one of them striking Bertin. The Ghana Boxing Authority (GBA) submitted video evidence to the police and later handed out suspensions to Sackey's trainer and two cornermen. Sackey's team filed an appeal with the WBO to protest the stoppage, but they officially recognized Mohammed as champion at a ceremony in November.

On 29 June 2019, Mohammed defeated Tanzanian rival Loren Japhet by 11th-round TKO to win the WBO Global super bantamweight title. In his first title defense on 31 January 2020, he knocked out John Amuzu of Benin with a brutal barrage of punches in the fourth round that sent him to the hospital. The victory moved him into the top ten of the WBO rankings for the first time.

Professional boxing record

Personal life
He grew up in the Kokomlemle district of Accra and started out as a footballer.

References

External links
 

Living people
1996 births
Ghanaian male boxers
Super-bantamweight boxers
Boxers from Accra